Pacifia is a genus of gastropods belonging to the family Unidentiidae.

The species of this genus are found in Northern America.

Species:

Pacifia amica 
Pacifia goddardi

References

Unidentiidae